Arany János utca (János Arany Street) is a station on the M3 (North-South) line of the Budapest Metro. It is located in District V under Bajcsy-Zsilinszky Street. Its single vestibule stands in Podmaniczky Frigyes Square. The station was opened on 30 December 1981 as part of the extension of the line from Deák Ferenc tér to Lehel tér.

Saint Stephen's Basilica is a prominent landmark a block south of the station.

Connections
Trolleybus: 72M
 Bus: 9, 15, 115

References

M3 (Budapest Metro) stations
Railway stations opened in 1981
1981 establishments in Hungary